Sedaxane is a chemical developed as a fungicide in the European Union.

The molecular grouping to which it belongs is a pyrazole-4-carboxylic acid amide; its method of action is as a succinate dehydrogenase inhibitor (SDHI).

It is approved in Austria, and pending approval in Germany and Switzerland.

References

German inventions
Hazardous materials
Fungicides
Organofluorides
Pyrazoles
Cyclopropanes
Anilides